Jack Murphy is an English rugby league footballer who plays as a  for the Swinton Lions.

He started his career with Wigan, making his Super League début against Bradford Bulls in 2012, during which he also scored his first Super League try. For the 2013 season he joined Salford on loan where, ironically, his first appearance was against Wigan. He spent the 2014 season on dual-registration with Workington Town, and signed a permanent deal with the club in October 2014.

References

External links
Swinton Lions profile

1992 births
Living people
English rugby league players
Rugby league fullbacks
Rugby league players from Warrington
Rugby league utility players
Salford Red Devils players
South Wales Scorpions players
Swinton Lions players
Wigan Warriors players
Workington Town players